Buxa Tiger Reserve is a tiger reserve and national park in northern West Bengal, India, covering an area of . At least 284 bird species inhabit the reserve. Mammals present include Asian elephant, gaur, Sambar deer, clouded leopard, Indian leopard, and Asian golden cat.

History

The historic Buxa Fort ( above m.s.l.). People have sentimental attachment with the fort on accounts of its association with the struggle for freedom.

Buxa Tiger Reserve was created in 1983 as the 15th tiger reserve in India. In 1986, Buxa Wildlife Sanctuary was constituted over 314.52 km2 of the reserve forests. In 1991, 54.47 km2 was added to Buxa Wildlife Sanctuary. A year later, in 1992, the Government of West Bengal declared its intentions to constitute a national park over 117.10 km2 of the Buxa Wildlife Sanctuary. State government finally declared national park with notification No.3403-For/11B-6/95 dt. 05.12.1997.

Geography

Location

Buxa Tiger Reserve lies in Alipurduar district of West Bengal. Its northern boundary runs along the international border with Bhutan. The Sinchula hill range lies all along the northern side of BTR and the eastern boundary touches that of the Assam state. National Highway No.31 C roughly runs along its southern boundary. It is the easternmost extension of extreme bio-diverse North-East India and represents highly endemic Indo-Malayan region. The fragile "Terai Eco-System" constitutes a part of this reserve. The Phibsoo Wildlife Sanctuary of Bhutan is contiguous to the north of BTR. Manas National Park lies on east of BTR. BTR, thus, serves as international corridor for Asian elephant migration between India and Bhutan. To the south-west, the Chilapata Forests form an elephant corridor to the Jaldapara Wildlife Sanctuary. The reserve encompasses as many as eight forest types.
The divisional headquarters is located at Alipurduar. The forest is divided into two divisions: East and West.
Buxa Fort is an important landmark for this reserve. This fort was captured by British-India in 1865 after the Bhutan War from Bhutan. Later this fort was used as a detention camp for Indian freedom fighters during the Indian freedom movement.

Geology
It is contiguous to the Buxa Formation of Mamley in Mamley village of Namchi neighboring state of Sikkim, the stromatolite bearing Dolomite Limestones, which has been declared national geological monument by the Geological Survey of India (GSI), for their protection, maintenance, promotion and enhancement of geotourism.

Biodiversity

Flora
More than 450 species of trees, 250 species of shrubs, 400 species of herbs, 9 species of cane, 10 species of bamboo, 150 species of orchids, 100 species of grass and 130 species of aquatic flora including more than 70 sedges (Cyperaceae) have been identified so far. There are more than 160 species of other monocotyledons and ferns.
The main trees are sal, champa, gamhar, simul and chikrasi.

Forest types include:
 Northern dry deciduous
 Eastern Bhabar and Terai sal
 East Himalayan moist mixed deciduous forest
 Sub-Himalayan secondary wet mixed forest
 Eastern sub-montane semi-evergreen forest
 Northern tropical evergreen forest
 East Himalayan subtropical wet hill forest
 Moist sal savannah
 Low alluvium
 Savannah woodland

Fauna
During a survey in May 2000 to July 2001, 284 bird species were recorded including Eurasian griffon (Gyps fulvus), Amur falcon (Falco amurensis), Malayan night heron (Gorsachius melanolophus), Oriental pied hornbill (Anthracoceros albirostris), rufous-necked hornbill (Aceros nipalensis), chestnut-breasted partridge (Arborophila mandellii), cinnamon bittern (Ixobrychus cinnamomeus), stripe-breasted woodpecker (Dendrocopos atratus), velvet-fronted nuthatch (Sitta frontalis) and black-naped oriole (Oriolus chinensis).
The Narathali lake, Raidāk and Jayanti rivers provide habitat to migratory birds like common merganser (Mergus merganser), Eurasian teal (Anas crecca), black-necked crane  (Grus nigricollis), black stork (Ciconia nigra), and ferruginous pochard (Aythya nyroca). Two new frog species were discovered in 2006.

The 73 mammal species include Indian leopard, Bengal tiger, clouded leopard, giant squirrel, gaur, chital and wild boar. 65 fish, 41 reptile and 4 amphibian species have been identified. In February 2018, both plain and spotted Asiatic golden cats (Catopuma temminckii) were recorded in the reserve for the first time.

Endangered species present in the reserve are leopard cat, Bengal florican, reticulated python, Chinese pangolin, hispid hare, hog deer lesser adjutant (Leptoptilos javanicus), white-rumped vulture (Gyps bengalensis), slender-billed vulture (Gyps tenuirostris), chestnut-breasted partridge (Arborophila mandellii), rufous necked hornbill (Aceros nipalensis), ferruginous pochard (Aythya nyroca) and great hornbill (Buceros bicornis).

Rajabhatkhawa Vulture Breeding Centre at Buxa Tiger Reserve for the breeding and conservation of endangered Indian vultures was established as the second such centre with the help of Bombay Natural History Society and British charity Royal Society for the Protection of Birds. It emulates the success of first ever such centre at Jatayu Conservation Breeding Centre, Pinjore.

Tourism

Tribal and ethnic groups 

Dukpa: the word probably comes from Drukpa, the people from the land of thunderstorm. They are the ancient ethnic group among the other inhabitants of Buxa Tiger Reserve. Dukpas used live in the hamlets of Buxa Hills from east to west. The seasonal migratory Dukpas are divided mainly into 30 different sects. They originally were the followers of (Drukpa Kagyud) Mahayani Buddhism. Some of them are converted into Christianity.

Trekking

Buxa (2,600 ft) is a one-hour, fifteen-minute (3.9 km) trek through picturesque surroundings from Santalabari, the starting point. The historical Buxa Fort was coming under the British India after the 2nd Dooars War (1865) between the Bhutan and the British, the subsidiary alliance of princely state Cooch Behar. This was used as a detention camp by the British, because of its remoteness during the Indian freedom movement. Many freedom fighters were imprisoned here. After independence, it served as a refugee camp for Tibetans and Bangladeshis.
There are a number of trekking routes through the jungle. 
There is a 4 km further trek to Rovers' Point or Romitey Dara (the land of beautiful birds at ).
From Buxa, one can also take the 13 km trek route for Jayanti via Mahakal Cave through the dense jungle (subjected to get permission from BTR). The Mahakal Cave is a stalactite-stalagmite cave, popularly known as the Mahakal cave near Jainty.
The most popular route is Pagsamkha Path Trek route, which starts from Buxa Fort, Buxaduar via Aadma and ends at Raimatung.
An expert guide and entry permit are must for trekking in Buxa hills.
One may visit the very beautiful village of Dukpas called Lapchakha (1.5 hour trek) from Buxa Fort. A beautiful trekkers' hut named Dukpa's Hut (with attached bath) is located just opposite to the Buxa Fort ground and besides of Rupang Valley Trek route. Though there are eight home stays in total, but mostly are located at Lapchakha with minimum facilities. Only Rovers' Inn at Sadar bazar have maximum capacity of accommodations but far from Buxa Fort. Dukpas Hut is also called 'Birders Nest' by the bird watchers. Trekking in different short route with camping facilities arranged from the Dukpas Hut. It has a separate kitchen for trekkers also. the double storied wooden hut has two family rooms (sleeping 3) on upper floor and a dormitory with attached bath on ground floor (sleeping 6) with dining facility. Bird watching, trekking and dark sky photography tours also arrange from here. The hut became an important centre for the promotion of tourism in this region. Wongyel and Chhogyel Dukpa are the two Dukpa brothers are to run the home stay and assist the trekkers here.
The Baksha Duar Post Office is a heritage building and the highest post office in Alipurduar District.
The tribe Dukpas (Indo-Bhutanese) lived in eleven hamlets of Buxa Hills which mostly located in hilly jungles of Buxa Tiger Reserve at altitude ranging from 2400–6200 feet.
Another entry point Rajabhatkhawa (17 km from Alipurduar) has an orchidarium, and a nature interpretation centre.
One can go for a circular trek from Buxaduar via Chunabhati-Adma to Raimatang. This is actually 8 hours tough trek with an expert guide but usually trekkers prefer to make it as a 3-day comfortable trek to understand nature and the ethnic culture of this region.

Pukri Mai is a small sacred pond inside the park where fishes like magur and singi and turtles are kept. Festivals are held at certain time of the year by both Buddhist and Hindus and local ethnic groups like Dukpas.

Issues

 Most rivers enter Buxa Tiger Reserve from Bhutan and carry huge amount of bed load obliterating beds of rivers in the reserve. Flooding is frequent. Critical habitats are lost.
 More than 100,000 cattle graze in the reserve daily. Weeds, unpalatable grasses and shrubs have invaded the overgrazed areas.
 Hilly, Bhabhar and riverine tracts of core suffer from fire. Generally non timber forest produce collectors and shepherds put forests on fire.
 No frequent poaching cases. Tribal population in tea gardens poach small mammals during Holi festival illicitly as part of ritual hunting.
 Bodo militants from Assam occasionally enter core. Timber thieves operate in the area.
 Five forest hamlets in hilly tract viz. Adma, Chunabhati, Santrabari, Tobgaon and Tashigaon have some encroachments by way of unauthorised orange orchards.
Dolomite mining in nearby areas.
Poachers come from Assam frequently to poach Indian elephants.

References

External links

 Everything about the Buxa Tiger Reserve
 Information about the Tiger Reserve
 Travel information for Buxa National Park
 Birds of Buxa Tiger Reserve
 Butterflies of Buxa Tiger Reserve & Samsing
 Flora of Buxa Tiger Reserve & Samsing
 Birding trip report of Jayanti Buxa

Tiger reserves of India
Dooars
Protected areas established in 1983
National parks in West Bengal
Tourist attractions in Alipurduar district
1983 establishments in West Bengal